Me, Grandma, Iliko and Ilarion is a first novel written by Nodar Dumbadze in 1960. Author accompanies his characters through the seasons, through the war and then the peace. The “Me” in the title is Zuriko, an orphan who lives with his grandmother Olgha.

Plot 
The life of Zuriko an orphan passes in the hands of his grandmother Olgha and weirdly funny and loving neighbors, Iliko and Ilarion. Despite of war and famine these people never lose the sense of humour. Iliko and Ilarion constantly prank each other in a series of practical jokes, though they are closest friends. Meanwhile, Zuriko writes his first poem and his first love letter. The time passes. Zuriko graduates in Tbilisi and comes back to his village.

External links 
 Me, Grandma, Iliko and Ilarioni (Film) in IMDB.
 Me, Grandma, Iliko and Ilarioni in Goodreads.

References 

1960 novels
20th-century Georgian novels
Georgian-language works
Novels by Nodar Dumbadze
Autobiographical novels